The 2011 Soling World Championships were held in Prien am Chiemsee, Germany between April 22 and 30, 2011. The hosting yacht club was Chiemsee Yacht Club.

Results

References

Sailing competitions in Germany